Kai Soremekun is a Canadian filmmaker and actor. She has dual Canadian/USA citizenship and lives in Los Angeles. She is best known for the 1991 film Regarding Henry, which starred Harrison Ford and Annette Bening, the 1995 film Heat, which starred Robert De Niro and Al Pacino, and the ongoing web series CHICK: Within Me Lives a Superhero.

Early life
Kai was born in Hamilton, and grew up in Toronto, Canada. Her father was a Nigerian doctor and her mother an English nurse, who met while working at the same hospital in Hamilton. She has two younger brothers. Most of her childhood years were spent in Thornhill, a suburb of Toronto.

She attended Thornlea Secondary School, then studied at the American Musical and Dramatic Academy in New York City, where she completed a two-year Certificate in Professional Performance.

Career
Kai Soremekun started her career in commercials, acting and dancing in music videos, and modeling for Nike in New York City.

She took a job on the set of Regarding Henry, as an extra, in a bid to gain experience and make some money.  During the course of filming, the director decided to give her the role of Loretta in a single scene with Harrison Ford and Bill Nunn.

In 1993, she moved to Los Angeles, where she was cast in the role of Denise on The Fresh Prince of Bel-Air.

In 1995, she landed a series regular role on a Fox television drama called Medicine Ball. During 1995 and 1996, KS studied filmmaking at Los Angeles City College.

While spending time with her parents in Toronto in 2002, she was cast in the TV movie, Heart of a Stranger. The film was shot in Halifax, Canada. Again, in 2003, she was chosen as a last minute replacement for the role of Peaches LeJeune in Love, Sex and Eating the Bones while on a holiday in Canada.

In 2006, Kai Soremekun was chosen to be a part of a program at CBS, which partnered young people with experienced directors. She was partnered with Jerry Levine while he directed an episode of Monk. He suggested she audition and she won a small role in that episode.

In 2007, she was selected by Steven Spielberg as a contestant on On the Lot, a short-lived reality show competition produced by Steven Spielberg and Mark Burnett. The show, which aired on Fox, featured filmmakers competing in weekly elimination competitions, with the ultimate prize of a million dollar development deal at DreamWorks. Soremekun was eliminated after one round.

Acting
Soremekun has appeared in the following films and television shows.

Film
1991: Regarding Henry - Loretta
1993: Back in Action - Tara
1995: Heat - Prostitute
1999: What We Did That Night (TV Movie) - Tera
2002: Heart of a Stranger (TV Movie)
2003: Love, Sex and Eating the Bones - Peaches LeJeune
2014: Everything That Rises Must Converge

Television
1993: The Fresh Prince of Bel-Air - Denise
1995: Medicine Ball - Dr. Nia James
1999: Seven Days - Linda
2006: Monk - Mayor's Assistant

Web series
2009-2010: CHICK: Within Me Lives a Superhero - Lisa / Fantastica

Directing
Soremekun has directed the following films and web series.

Short films
 2001 Maple
 2002 The Style of My Soul
 2003 Lock Her Room
 2007 Lily and Grant
 2007 The Timer Game

Web series
 2009 CHICK: Within Me Lives a Superhero

References

External links
 Official website
 
 Kai Soremekun at Rotten Tomatoes
 CHICK at Blip.tv
 CHICK at YouTube

Living people
Actresses from Los Angeles
Writers from Los Angeles
Screenwriters from California
American women screenwriters
21st-century American women writers
Year of birth missing (living people)
21st-century American screenwriters